The 2018 Rice Owls football team represented Rice University in the 2018 NCAA Division I FBS football season. The Owls played their home games at the Rice Stadium in Houston, Texas, and competed in the West Division of Conference USA (C–USA). They were led by first-year head coach Mike Bloomgren. They finished the season 2–11, 1–7 in C-USA play to finish in a tie for sixth place in the West Division.

Previous season
The Owls finished the 2017 season 1–11, 1–7 in C-USA play to finish in sixth place in the West Division.

On November 27, head coach David Bailiff was fired. He finished at Rice with an 11-year record of 57–80.

Preseason

Preseason All-CUSA team
Conference USA released their preseason all-CUSA team on July 16, 2018, with the Owls having one player selected.

Special teams

Jack Fox – P

Preseason media poll
Conference USA released their preseason media poll on July 17, 2018, with the Owls predicted to finish in a tie for sixth place in the West Division.

Schedule

Schedule Source:

Game summaries

Prairie View A&M

Houston

at Hawaii

at Southern Miss

at Wake Forest

UTSA

UAB

at FIU

at North Texas

UTEP

at Louisiana Tech

at LSU

Old Dominion

References

Rice
Rice Owls football seasons
Rice Owls football